Cynthia "Cindy" Paige Simon (born October 21, 1970) is an American visually impaired retired Paralympic judoka who competed in international level events. She was also a former swimmer from 1984 to 2000.

References

1970 births
Living people
People from Wayne, New Jersey
Paralympic judoka of the United States
Judoka at the 2012 Summer Paralympics
Sportspeople from Passaic County, New Jersey